Barney Burton was a legislator in South Carolina. He served in the South Carolina House of Representatives in 1868 and 1870. He represented Chester County, South Carolina.

He was involved with the Chester A.M.E. Baptist church in its early days.

He was a delegate to the South Carolina Constitutional Convention of 1868. He represented Chester County in the South Carolina House of Representatives in 1868 along with Sancho Sanders and Barney Humphries.

See also
African-American officeholders during and following the Reconstruction era

References

Year of birth missing
19th-century American politicians
People from Chester County, South Carolina
African-American state legislators in South Carolina
Members of the South Carolina House of Representatives
People of the African Methodist Episcopal church
African-American politicians during the Reconstruction Era
Year of death missing